Paul Hill (1934 – September 27, 1999) was founder and music director of the Master Chorale of Washington, formerly the Paul Hill Chorale.

Paul Hill was also involved in television, and his 1978 production of Menotti's "The Unicorn, the Gorgon and the Manticore" won an Emmy Award.

References

1934 births
1999 deaths
20th-century American musicians